Hakaniemi metro station is a station on the Helsinki Metro. It serves the central Helsinki districts of Hakaniemi and Kallio. Both lines M1 and M2 serve Hakaniemi. There are 28 bicycle parking spaces at the station.

Opened on 1 June 1982, Hakaniemi was among the first metro stations opened in Helsinki. It was designed by Mirja Castrén, Juhani Jauhiainen, and Marja Nuuttila. It is located 900 meters from the University of Helsinki station, and 900 meters from Sörnäinen metro station. The station is situated at a depth of 23 meters below ground level and 21 meters below sea level.

In popular culture 
The Hakaniemi metro station was seen in Aki Kaurismäki's film Calamari Union. Hakaniemi metro station was also featured in Bomfunk MC's music video for the hit single "Freestyler".

References

External links

Helsinki Metro stations
Railway stations opened in 1982
1982 establishments in Finland
Hakaniemi